Daniel Velez (born December 9, 1983) is a Puerto Rican former swimmer, who specialized in breaststroke events. He represented his nation Puerto Rico at the 2008 Summer Olympics, and has won a career total of three medals (two golds and one bronze) at the 2005 Maccabiah Games in Netanya, Israel. Velez was also a member of the NC State Wolfpack swimming and diving team under head coach Brooks Teal, while pursuing his degree in psychology at North Carolina State University in Raleigh, North Carolina.

Velez competed for the Puerto Rican squad in the men's 100 m breaststroke at the 2008 Summer Olympics in Beijing. Five months before the Games, he threw down a lifetime best of 1:03.63 to slip past the FINA B-cut (1:03.72) by almost a tenth of a second (0.1) at the All-American Championships in Austin, Texas, United States. Velez slipped to the front from lane one to touch the wall first in heat three with a remarkable Puerto Rican record in 1:01.80, slashing 1.83 seconds off his own entry standard and beating India's Sandeep Sejwal, who finished behind him, in a close finish by only a small fraction of a second. Despite his outstanding feat in the heats, Velez ended his Olympic campaign with a thirty-third place overall finish and did not advance to the semifinals.

References

External links
NBC Olympics Profile

1983 births
Living people
Puerto Rican Jews
Puerto Rican male swimmers
Jewish swimmers
Olympic swimmers of Puerto Rico
Swimmers at the 2008 Summer Olympics
Male breaststroke swimmers
Maccabiah Games gold medalists for the United States
Maccabiah Games bronze medalists for the United States
Sportspeople from San Juan, Puerto Rico
NC State Wolfpack men's swimmers
North Carolina State University alumni
Maccabiah Games medalists in swimming